Joseph P. Ward is an American historian and author who is currently dean of the College of Humanities and Social Sciences at Utah State University.

Biography 
Joseph Ward grew up in Southern New England, seeing massive upheaval from the loss of manufacturing jobs, a change he later credited for his interest in history. Ward earned his Bachelor of Arts in history at University of Chicago and received a masters and a doctorate in history from Stanford University. In 2017 he was made the head of the search committee for Utah State's next provost, a position previously held by current president Noelle E. Cockett. That search eventually led to hiring of Frank Galey.

Career
Visiting Instructor, Department of History, University of California, Davis, April–June 1992.
Assistant Professor, Department of History, Wayne State University, August 1992 – July 1998.
Professor, Chair, Arch Dalrymple III Department of History, University of Mississippi, January 1997 – July 2016.
Dean, College of Humanities and Social Sciences, Utah State University, since July 2016

Works

Awards
Donald R. Cole Excellence in Promoting Inclusiveness in Graduate Education Award - 2006 University of Mississippi

Personal life
Ward is married to Sue Grayzel, another American academic historian.

References

Living people
American writers
Year of birth missing (living people)